Commodore Disk User, also referred to as CDU, was a magazine for the Commodore range of computers, including the Commodore 64, Commodore 128 and Commodore Plus/4. Each issue had a cover-mounted disk containing software.

History

It was published in the UK by Argus Specialist Publications which also published the Your Commodore. It was aimed at Commodore users who had a 1541 disk drive and did not want to have to type in program listings. It also meant that larger programs could be included with the magazine. Initially, an issue of the magazine was published every two months but after two years, it became monthly.

The magazine survived until the end of 1991. The last issue (number 36) was cover dated October 1991. Copies were scanned into Archive.org in 2011.

References

Bi-monthly magazines published in the United Kingdom
Defunct computer magazines published in the United Kingdom
Home computer magazines
Commodore 8-bit computer magazines
Magazines established in 1987
Magazines disestablished in 1991
Magazines published in London
Monthly magazines published in the United Kingdom
Video game magazines published in the United Kingdom